The following is a partial list of currently operating state schools in the unitary council areas of East Ayrshire, East Dunbartonshire, East Lothian, East Renfrewshire, Falkirk, Fife and Highland in Scotland, United Kingdom. You may also find :Category:Schools in Scotland of use to find a particular school. See also the List of the oldest schools in the United Kingdom.

By unitary council area.

Note that the allocations to address and council area may not be accurate in every case and you can help if you have access to local directories.

East Ayrshire

Nursery schools
Cairns Early Childhood Centre, Kilmarnock
Flowerbank Early Childhood Centre, Kilmarnock
Hillbank Early Childhood Centre, Kilmarnock
Riccarton Early Childhood Centre, Kilmarnock

Primary schools
Annanhill Primary School, Kilmarnock
Auchinleck Primary School, Auchinleck
Bellsbank Primary School, Bellsbank
Catrine Primary School, Catrine
Crosshouse Primary School, Crosshouse
Dalmellington Primary School, Dalmellington
Dalrymple Primary School, Dalrymple
Darvel Primary School, Darvel
Drongan Primary School, Drongan
Dunlop Primary School, Dunlop
Fenwick Primary School, Fenwick
Galston Primary School, Galston
Gargieston Primary School, Kilmarnock
Hillhead Primary School, Kilmarnock
Hurlford Primary School, Hurlford
James Hamilton Primary School, Kilmarnock
Kilmaurs Primary School, Kilmaurs
Lainshaw Primary School, Stewarton
Littlemill Primary School, Rankinston
Loanhead Primary School, Kilmarnock
Lochnorris Primary School, Cumnock
Logan Primary School, Logan
Mauchline Primary School, Mauchline
Mount Carmel Primary School, Kilmarnock
Muirkirk Primary School, Muirkirk
Nether Robertland Primary School, Stewarton
Netherthird Primary School, Cumnock
New Cumnock Primary School, New Cumnock
Newmilns Primary School, Newmilns
Ochiltree Primary School, Ochiltree
Onthank Primary School, Kilmarnock
Patna Primary School, Patna
Shortlees Primary School, Kilmarnock
Sorn Primary School, Sorn
St. Andrew's Primary School, Kilmarnock
St. Patrick's Primary School, Auchinleck
St. Sophia's Primary School, Galston
St. Xavier's Primary School, Patna
Whatriggs Primary School, Kilmarnock

Secondary schools
Doon Academy, Dalmellington
Grange Academy, Kilmarnock
Kilmarnock Academy, Kilmarnock
Loudoun Academy, Galston
Robert Burns Academy, Cumnock
Saint Joseph's Academy, Kilmarnock
Stewarton Academy, Stewarton

Special schools
Hillside School, Cumnock
Park School, Kilmarnock
Willowbank School, Kilmarnock

East Dunbartonshire

Primary schools
Baldernock Primary School, Torrance
Baljaffray Primary School, Bearsden
Balmuildy Primary School, Bishopbriggs
Bearsden Primary School, Bearsden
Castlehill Primary School, Bearsden
Clober Primary School, Milngavie
Colquhoun Park Primary School, Bearsden
Craigdhu Primary School, Milngavie
Craighead Primary School, Milton of Campsie
Gartconner Primary School, Kirkintilloch
Harestanes Primary School, Kirkintilloch
Hillhead Primary School, Kirkintilloch
Holy Family Primary School, Kirkintilloch
Holy Trinity Primary School, Kirkintilloch
Killermont Primary School, Bearsden
Lairdsland Primary School, Kirkintilloch
Lennoxtown Primary School, Lennoxtown
Lenzie Meadow Primary School, Lenzie
Meadowburn Primary School, Bishopbriggs
Millersneuk Primary School, Lenzie
Milngavie Primary School, Milngavie
Mosshead Primary School, Bearsden
Oxgang Primary School, Kirkintilloch
St. Helen's Primary School, Bishopbriggs
St. Machan's Primary School, Lennoxtown
St. Matthew's Primary School, Bishopbriggs
St. Nicholas' Primary School, Bearsden
Thomas Muir Primary School, Bishopbriggs
Torrance Primary School, Torrance
Twechar Primary School, Twechar
Wester Cleddens Primary School, Bishopbriggs
Westerton Primary School, Bearsden

Secondary schools
Bearsden Academy, Bearsden
Bishopbriggs Academy, Bishopbriggs
Boclair Academy, Bearsden
Douglas Academy, Milngavie
Kirkintilloch High School, Kirkintilloch
Lenzie Academy, Lenzie
St. Ninian's High School, Kirkintilloch
Turnbull High School, Bishopbriggs

Special schools
Campsie View School, Lenzie
Merkland School, Kirkintilloch

East Lothian

Nursery schools
Olivebank Children and Family Centre, Musselburgh

Primary schools
Aberlady Primary School, Aberlady
Athelstaneford Primary School, Athelstaneford
Campie Primary School, Musselburgh
Cockenzie Primary School, Cockenzie and Port Seton
Dirleton Primary School, Dirleton
Dunbar Primary School, Dunbar
East Linton Primary School, East Linton
Elphinstone Primary School, Elphinstone
Gullane Primary School, Gullane
Haddington Primary School, Haddington
Humbie Primary School, Humbie
Innerwick Primary School, Innerwick
Law Primary School, North Berwick
Letham Mains Primary School, Haddington
Longniddry Primary School, Longniddry
Loretto R.C. Primary School, Musselburgh
Macmerry Primary School, Macmerry
Musselburgh Burgh Primary School, Musselburgh
Ormiston Primary School, Ormiston
Pencaitland Primary School, Pencaitland
Pinkie St Peter's Primary School, Musselburgh
Preston Tower Primary School, Prestonpans
Saltoun Primary School, East Saltoun
Sanderson's Wynd Primary School, Tranent
St. Gabriel's R.C. Primary School, Prestonpans
St. Martin's R.C Primary School, Tranent
St. Mary's R.C. Primary School, Haddington
Stenton Primary School, Stenton
Stoneyhill Primary School, Musselburgh
Wallyford Primary School, Wallyford
West Barns Primary School, Dunbar
Whitecraig Primary School, Musselburgh
Windygoul Primary School, Tranent
Yester Primary School, Gifford

Secondary schools
Dunbar Grammar School, Dunbar
Knox Academy, Haddington
Musselburgh Grammar School, Musselburgh
North Berwick High School, North Berwick
Preston Lodge High School, Prestonpans
Ross High School, Tranent

East Renfrewshire

Nursery schools
Arthurlie Family Centre, Barrhead
Carlibar Family Centre, Barrhead
Cart Mill Family Centre, Clarkston
Glen Family Centre, Thornliebank
Glenwood Family Centre, Thornliebank
Hazeldene Family Centre, Newton Mearns
Madras Family Centre, Neilston
McCready Family Centre, Barrhead

Primary schools
Braidbar Primary School, Giffnock
Busby Primary School, Clarkston
Calderwood Lodge Primary School, Newton Mearns
Carlibar Primary School, Barrhead
Carolside Primary School, Clarkston
Crookfur Primary School, Newton Mearns
Cross Arthurlie Primary School, Barrhead
Eaglesham Primary School, Eaglesham
Giffnock Primary School, Giffnock
Hillview Primary School, Barrhead
Kirkhill Primary School, Newton Mearns
Maidenhill Primary School, Newton Mearns
Mearns Primary School, Newton Mearns
Neilston Primary School, Neilston
Netherlee Primary School, Netherlee
Our Lady of the Missions Primary School, Thornliebank or Giffnock
St. Cadoc's Primary School, Newton Mearns
St. Clare's Primary School, Newton Mearns
St. John's Primary School, Barrhead
St. Joseph's Primary School, Busby
St. Mark's Primary School, Barrhead
St. Thomas' Primary School, Neilston
Thornliebank Primary School, Thornliebank
Uplawmoor Primary School, Uplawmoor

Secondary schools
Barrhead High School, Barrhead
Eastwood High School, Newton Mearns
Mearns Castle High School, Newton Mearns
St Luke's High School, Barrhead
St Ninian's High School, Giffnock
Williamwood High School, Clarkston
Woodfarm High School, Thornliebank

Special schools
Isobel Mair School, Newton Mearns

Falkirk

Nursery schools
Bonnypark Early Learning and Childcare Centre, Bonnybridge
Camelon Early Learning and Childcare Centre, Camelon
Inchlair Nursery, Stenhousemuir
Kinneil Early Years Campus, Bo'ness
Larbert Early Learning and Childcare Centre, Larbert 
Myot View Early Learning and Childcare Centre, Denny
Parkhill Early Learning and Childcare Campus, Polmont
Queen Street Early Learning and Childcare Centre, Falkirk
Rannoch Early Learning and Childcare Centre, Grangemouth

Primary schools
Airth Primary School, Airth
Antonine Primary School, Bonnybridge
Avonbridge Primary School, Avonbridge
Bainsford Primary School, Bainsford
Bankier Primary School, Banknock
Bantaskin Primary School, Falkirk
Beancross Primary School, Grangemouth
Blackness Primary School, Blackness
Bo'ness Public Primary School, Bo'ness
Bonnybridge Primary School, Bonnybridge
Bowhouse Primary School, Grangemouth
California Primary School, California
Carmuirs Primary School, Camelon
Carron Primary School, Carron
Carronshore Primary School, Carronshore
Comely Park Primary School, Falkirk
Deanburn Primary School, Bo'ness
Denny Primary School, Denny
Drumbowie Primary School, Standburn
Dunipace Primary School, Dunipace
Easter Carmuirs Primary School, Camelon
Grange Primary School, Bo'ness
Hallglen Primary School, Glen Village
Head of Muir Primary School, Denny
Kinnaird Primary School, Larbert 
Kinneil Primary and Early Years Campus, Bo'ness
Ladeside Primary School, Larbert
Langlees Primary School, Bainsford
Larbert Village Primary School, Larbert
Laurieston Primary School, Laurieston
Maddiston Primary School, Maddiston
Moray Primary School, Grangemouth
Nethermains Primary School, Denny
Sacred Heart R.C. Primary School, Grangemouth
Shieldhill Primary School, Shieldhill
Slamannan Primary School, Slamannan
St. Andrew's R.C. Primary School, Falkirk
St. Bernadette's R.C. Primary School, Stenhousemuir
St. Francis Xavier's R.C. Primary School, Bainsford
St. Joseph's R.C. Primary School, Bonnybridge
St. Margaret's Primary School, Polmont
St. Mary's R.C. Primary School, Bo'ness
St. Patrick's R.C. Primary School, Denny
Stenhousemuir Primary School, Stenhousemuir
Victoria Primary School, Falkirk
Wallacestone Primary School, Brightons
Westquarter Primary School, Westquarter
Whitecross Primary School, Whitecross

Secondary schools
Bo'ness Academy, Bo'ness
Braes High School, Reddingmuirhead
Denny High School, Denny
Falkirk High School, Falkirk
Graeme High School, Falkirk
Grangemouth High School, Grangemouth
Larbert High School, Larbert
St Mungo's High School, Bainsford

Special schools
Carrongrange High School, Larbert
Mariner Support Service, Falkirk
Oxgang School and Support Service, Grangemouth
Windsor Park School, Falkirk

Fife

Nursery schools
Secret Garden (outdoor nursery), Letham

Primary schools
Aberdour Primary School, Aberdour
Aberhill Primary School, Methil
Anstruther Primary School, Anstruther
Auchtermuchty Primary School, Auchtermuchty
Auchtertool Primary School, Auchtertool
Balcurvie Primary School, Windygates
Balmerino Primary School, Gauldry
Balmullo Primary School, Balmullo
Bellyeoman Primary School, Dunfermline
Benarty Primary School, Lochore
Blairhall Primary School, Blairhall
Buckhaven Primary School, Buckhaven
Burntisland Primary School, Burntisland
Cairneyhill Primary and Community School, Cairneyhill 
Camdean Primary School, Rosyth
Canmore Primary School, Dunfermline
Canongate Primary School, St. Andrews
Capshard Primary School, Kirkcaldy
Cardenden Primary School, Cardenden
Carleton Primary School, Glenrothes
Carneige Primary School, Dunfermline
Carnock Primary School, Carnock
Caskieberran Primary School, Glenrothes
Castlehill Primary School, Cupar
Ceres Primary School, Ceres
Coaltown of Balgonie Primary School, Coaltown of Balgonie
Coaltown of Wemyss Primary School, Coaltown of Wemyss
Colinsburgh Primary School, Colinsburgh
Collydean Primary School, Glenrothes
Commercial Primary School, Dunfermline
Cowdenbeath Primary School, Cowdenbeath
Craigrothie Primary School, Craigrothie
Crail Primary School, Crail
Crossford Primary School, Crossford
Crossgates Primary School, Crossgates
Culross Primary School, Culross
Dairsie Primary School, Dairsie
Dalgety Bay Primary School, Dalgety Bay
Denbeath Primary School, Buckhaven
Denend Primary School, Cardenden
Donibristle Primary School, Dalgety Bay
Duloch Primary School, Dunfermline
Dunbog Primary School, Cupar
Dunnikier Primary School, Kirkcaldy
Dysart Primary School, Dysart
East Wemyss Primary School, East Wemyss
Elie Primary School, Elie
Fair Isle Primary School, Kirkcaldy
Falkland Primary School, Falkland
Foulford Primary School, Cowdenbeath
Freuchie Primary School, Freuchie
Greyfriars R.C. Primary School, St. Andrews
Guardbridge Primary School, Guardbridge
Hill of Beath Primary School, Hill of Beath
Holy Name R.C. Primary School, Oakley
Inverkeithing Primary School, Inverkeithing
Inzievar Primary School, Oakley
Kelty Primary School, Kelty
Kennoway Primary and Community School, Kennoway
Kettle Primary School, Kingskettle
Kinghorn Primary School, Kinghorn
Kinglassie Primary School, Kinglassie
Kings Road Primary School, Rosyth
Kingsbarns Primary School, Kingsbarns
Kirkcaldy North Primary School, Kirkcaldy
Kirkcaldy West Primary School, Kirkcaldy
Kirkton of Largo Primary School, Upper Largo
Ladybank Primary School, Ladybank
Largoward Primary School, Largoward
Lawhead Primary School, St. Andrews
Leslie Primary School, Leslie
Letham Primary School, Letham
Leuchars Primary School, Leuchars
Limekilns Primary School, Limekilns
Lochgelly South Primary School, Lochgelly
Lochgelly West Primary School, Lochgelly
Lumphinnans Primary Community School, Lumphinnans
Lundin Mill Primary School, Lundin Links
Lynburn Primary School, Dunfermline
Markinch Primary School, Markinch
Masterton Primary School, Dunfermline
McLean Primary School, Dunfermline
Methilhill Primary School, Methilhill
Milesmark Primary School, Dunfermline
Milton of Balgonie Primary School, Milton of Balgonie
Mountfleurie Primary School, Leven
Newburgh Primary School, Newburgh
Newcastle Primary School, Glenrothes
Newport Primary School, Newport-on-Tay
North Queensferry Primary School, North Queensferry
Park Road Primary School, Rosyth
Parkhill Primary School, Leven
Pathhead Primary School, Kirkcaldy
Pitcoudie Primary School, Glenrothes
Pitlessie Primary School, Pitlessie
Pitreavie Primary School, Dunfermline
Pittencrieff Primary School, Dunfermline
Pittenweem Primary School, Pittenweem
Pitteuchar East Primary School, Glenrothes
Pitteuchar West Primary School, Glenrothes
Rimbleton Primary School, Glenrothes
Saline Primary School, Saline
Sinclairtown Primary School, Kirkcaldy
South Parks Primary School, Glenrothes
Southwood Primary School, Glenrothes
Springfield Primary School, Springfield
St. Agatha's R.C. Primary School, Leven
St. Bride's R.C. Primary School, Cowdenbeath
St. Columba's R.C. Primary School, Cupar
St. John's R.C. Primary School, Rosyth
St. Joseph's R.C. Primary School, Kelty
St. Kenneth's R.C. Primary School, Ballingry
St. Leonard's Primary School, Dunfermline
St. Margaret's R.C. Primary School, Dunfermline
St. Marie's R.C. Primary School, Kirkcaldy
St. Monans Primary School, St Monans
St. Ninian's R.C. Primary School, Cardenden
St. Patrick's R.C. Primary School, Lochgelly
St. Paul's R.C. Primary School, Glenrothes
St. Serf's R.C. Primary School, High Valleyfield
Star Primary School, Star
Strathallan Primary School, Kirkcaldy
Strathkinness Primary School, Strathkinness
Strathmiglo Primary School, Strathmiglo
Tayport Primary School, Tayport
Thornton Primary School, Thornton
Torbain Primary School, Kirkcaldy
Torryburn Primary School, Newmills
Touch Primary School, Dunfermline
Townhill Primary School, Dunfermline
Tulliallan Primary School, Kincardine on Forth
Valley Primary School, Kirkcaldy
Wormit Primary School, Wormit

Secondary schools
Auchmuty High School, Glenrothes
Balwearie High School, Kirkcaldy
Beath High School, Cowdenbeath
Bell Baxter High School, Cupar
Dunfermline High School, Dunfermline
Glenrothes High School, Glenrothes
Glenwood High School, Glenrothes
Inverkeithing High School, Inverkeithing
Kirkcaldy High School, Kirkcaldy
Levenmouth Academy, Buckhaven
Lochgelly High School, Lochgelly
Madras College, St. Andrews
Queen Anne High School, Dunfermline
St. Andrew's R.C. High School, Kirkcaldy
St. Columba's R.C. High School, Dunfermline
Viewforth High School, Kirkcaldy
Waid Academy, Anstruther
Woodmill High School, Dunfermline

Special schools
Calaiswood School, Dunfermline
Hyndhead School, Buckhaven
John Fergus School, Glenrothes
Kilmaron School, Cupar
Rosslyn School, Kirkcaldy
Woodmill ASN, Dunfermline

Highland

Primary schools
Abernethy Primary School, Nethy Bridge
Acharacle Primary School, Acharacle
Achiltibuie Primary School, Ullapool
Aldourie Primary School, Aldourie
Alvie Primary School, Kingussie
Applecross Primary School, Strathcarron
Ardersier Primary School, Ardersier
Ardgour Primary School, Ardgour
Ardross Primary School, Alness
Arisaig Primary School, Arisaig
Auchtertyre Primary School, Kyle of Lochalsh
Auldearn Primary School, Auldearn
Aviemore Primary School, Aviemore
Avoch Primary School, Avoch
Ballachulish Primary School, Ballachulish
Balloch Primary School, Balloch
Balnain Primary School, Balnain
Banavie Primary School, Fort William
Beauly Primary School, Beauly
Ben Wyvis Primary School, Conon Bridge
Bishop Eden's Primary School, Inverness
Bonar Bridge Primary School, Ardgay
Bower Primary School, by Wick
Bridgend Primary School, Alness
Broadford Primary School, Isle of Skye
Brora Primary School, Brora
Bualnaluib Primary School, Aultbea
Bun-sgoil Ghàidhlig Inbhir Nis, Inverness
Bun-sgoil Ghàidhlig Loch Abar, Fort William
Bun-sgoil Shlèite, Sleat, Isle of Skye
Canisbay Primary School, Wick
Cannich Bridge Primary School, Beauly
Caol Primary School, Fort William
Carbost Primary School, Isle of Skye
Carrbridge Primary School, Carrbridge
Castletown Primary School, Thurso
Cauldeen Primary School, Inverness
Cawdor Primary School, Nairn
Central Primary School, Inverness
Coulhill Primary School, Alness
Cradlehall Primary School, Inverness
Craighill Primary School, Tain
Cromarty Primary School, Cromarty
Crossroads Primary School, Thurso
Crown Primary School, Inverness
Croy Primary School, Inverness
Culbokie Primary School, Dingwall
Dalneigh Primary School, Inverness
Daviot Primary School, Inverness
Deshar Primary School, Boat of Garten
Dingwall Primary School, Dingwall
Dochgarroch Primary School, Inverness
Dornoch Primary School, Dornoch
Drakies Primary School, Inverness
Dunbeath Primary School, Dunbeath
Duncan Forbes Primary School, Culloden
Dunvegan Primary School, Isle of Skye
Durness Primary School, Durness
Duror Primary School, Appin
Edderton Primary School, Tain
Edinbane Primary School, Isle of Skye
Eigg Primary School, Isle of Eigg
Farr Primary School, Inverness
Farr Primary School, Sutherland
Ferintosh Primary School, Easter Kinkell
Foyers Primary School, Foyers
Gairloch Primary School, Gairloch
Gledfield Primary School, Ardgay
Glencoe Primary School, Glencoe
Glenelg Primary School, Glenelg
Glenurquhart Primary School, Drumnadrochit
Golspie Primary School, Sutherland
Grantown Primary School, Grantown-on-Spey
Halkirk Primary School, Halkirk
Helmsdale Primary School, Helmsdale
Hill of Fearn Primary School, Fearn
Hilton of Cadboll Primary School, Fearn
Hilton Primary School, Hilton
Holm Primary School, Inverness
Inshes Primary School, Inverness
Inver Primary School, Tain
Invergarry Primary School, Invergarry
Inverie Primary School, Knoydart
Inverlochy Primary School, Fort William
Keiss Primary School, Wick
Kilchoan Primary School, Acharacle
Kilchuimen Primary School, Fort Augustus
Kilmuir Primary School, Isle of Skye
Kiltearn Primary School, Evanton
Kingussie Primary School, Kingussie
Kinlochbervie Primary School, Lairg
Kinlochleven Primary School, Kinlochleven
Kinmylies Primary School, Inverness
Kirkhill Primary School, Kirkhill
Knockbreck Primary School, Dunvegan, Isle of Skye
Knockbreck Primary School, Tain
Kyle Primary School, Kyle of Lochalsh
Kyleakin Primary School, Isle of Skye
Lady Lovat Primary School, Morar
Lairg Primary School, Lairg
Loch Duich Primary School, Inverinate
Lochaline Primary School, Lochaline
Lochardil Primary School, Inverness
Lochcarron Primary School, Lochcarron
Lochinver Primary School, Lochinver
Lundavra Primary School, Fort William
Lybster Primary School, Lybster
MacDiarmid Primary School, Carbost
Mallaig Primary School, Mallaig
Marybank Primary School, Muir of Ord
Melvich Primary School, Thurso
Merkinch Primary School, Inverness
Millbank Primary School, Nairn
Miller Academy Primary School, Thurso
Milton of Leys Primary School, Milton of Leys
Milton Primary School, Invergordon
Mount Pleasant Primary School, Thurso
Muck Primary School, Mallaig
Muirtown Primary School, Inverness
Mulbuie Primary School, Muir of Ord
Munlochy Primary School, Munlochy
Newmore Primary School, Invergordon
Newton Park Primary School, Wick
Newtonmore Primary School, Newtonmore
North Kessock Primary School, North Kessock
Noss Primary School, Wick
Obsdale Primary School, Alness
Park Primary School, Invergordon
Pennyland Primary School, Thurso
Plockton Primary School, Plockton
Poolewe Primary School, Achnasheen
Portree Primary School, Isle of Skye 
Raasay Primary School, Isle of Raasay
Raigmore Primary School, Inverness
Reay Primary School, Thurso
Resolis Primary School, Dingwall
Rogart Primary School, Rogart
Rosebank Primary School, Nairn
Rosehall Primary School, Lairg
Rum Primary School, Isle of Rum
Scoraig Primary School, Dundonnell
Scourie Primary School, Scourie
Shieldaig Primary School, Strathcarron
Smithton Primary School, Inverness
South Lodge Primary School, Invergordon
Spean Bridge Primary School, Spean Bridge
St. Bride's Primary School, Fort William
St. Columba's R.C Primary School, Caol 
St. Joseph's R.C. Primary School, Inverness
Staffin Primary School, Isle of Skye
Strathconon Primary School, Muir of Ord
Strathdearn Primary School, Tomatin
Stratherrick Primary School, Inverness
Strathgarve Primary School, Garve
Strathpeffer Primary School, Strathpeffer
Strontian Primary School, Strontian
Tarbat Old Primary School, Portmahomack
Tarradale Primary School, Muir of Ord
Teanassie Primary School, Beauly
Thrumster Primary School, Wick
Tomnacross Primary School, Kiltarlity
Tongue Primary School, Tongue
Tore Primary School, Muir of Ord
Ullapool Primary School, Ullapool
Watten Primary School, Watten

Secondary schools
Alness Academy, Alness
Ardnamurchan High School, Strontian
Charleston Academy, Inverness
Culloden Academy, Inverness
Dingwall Academy, Dingwall
Dornoch Academy, Dornoch
Farr High School, Bettyhill
Fortrose Academy, Fortrose
Gairloch High School, Gairloch
Glen Urquhart High School, Drumnadrochit
Golspie High School, Golspie
Grantown Grammar School, Grantown-on-Spey
Invergordon Academy, Invergordon
Inverness High School, Inverness
Inverness Royal Academy, Inverness
Kilchuimen Academy, Fort Augustus
Kingussie High School, Kingussie
Kinlochbervie High School, Kinlochbervie
Kinlochleven High School, Kinlochleven
Lochaber High School, Fort William
Mallaig High School, Mallaig
Millburn Academy, Inverness
Nairn Academy, Nairn
Plockton High School, Plockton
Portree High School, Isle of Skye
Tain Royal Academy, Tain
Thurso High School, Thurso
Ullapool High School, Ullapool
Wick High School, Wick

Special schools
Drummond School, Inverness
St. Clement's School, Dingwall
St. Duthus School, Tain
The Bridge, Inverness

Other schools in Scotland
List of independent schools in Scotland
List of state schools in Scotland (city council areas)
List of state schools in Scotland (council areas excluding cities, A–D)
List of state schools in Scotland (council areas excluding cities, I–R)
List of state schools in Scotland (council areas excluding cities, S–W)

See also
Education in the United Kingdom
Education in Scotland
Education Scotland

External links
The website Friends Reunited has a large index of schools but it is not possible to readily distinguish as to which schools are currently operating or closed.
The website UK Schools & Colleges Database lists currently operating state (and some independent) schools by Local Education Authority and also links to websites of individual schools where available.

E-H
State schools
Schools in Scotland by council area